Arne Lyng (born 29 September 1962 in Darmstadt, Germany) is a Norwegian district court judge currently employed at Oslo District Court.

On December 23, 2011 it became known that he, along with Wenche Elizabeth Arntzen, was to preside over the criminal trial of Anders Behring Breivik, who was accused of terrorism and mass murder following the 2011 Norway attacks. The trial lasted from April 16 until June 22, 2012.

Background 
Lyng has previously worked as deputy judge at Vesterålen District Court, advisor and special advisor for the Financial Supervisory Authority of Norway, chief secretary for the Bank Act Commission, and as lawyer in Law Firm Lyng & Co.

Lyng is the nephew of Jon Lyng, defense counsel in the trial of Arne Treholt.

References 

Living people
1962 births
20th-century Norwegian lawyers
Judges from Oslo
Jurists from Darmstadt
2011 Norway attacks
21st-century Norwegian judges